Ethulose is a laxative. It is also known as ethylhydroxyethylcellulose.

As a food additive with INS number 467, ethulose is used as an emulsifier.

References 

Cellulose
Food additives
Laxatives
Cellulose ethers